The Power of Kindness is a 2021 Facebook Watch digital special hosted by Lady Gaga for World Kindness Day. Produced by James Shani's Asylum Films and Lady Gaga’s Born This Way Foundation, the 30-minute documentary short film aired on Facebook Watch on November 13, 2021 and features psychologist, author, mental health expert, and founder of the AAKOMA Project, Dr. Alfiee Breland-Noble.

The Power of Kindness explores how compassion and kindness can be used as tools for improving personal mental health, supporting people, and improving the sense of unity amongst different communities. In the special, Lady Gaga, Breland-Noble, and a group of young adults from across the US discuss their struggles, proud moments, and important lessons from their own mental health journeys.

Summary
In “The Power of Kindness,” mental health expert, psychologist, and founder of the AAKOMA Project, Dr. Alfiee Breland-Noble and host Lady Gaga sit down with eleven young adults from across the United States to discuss how kindness relates to mental health. The short film’s discussion group includes LGBTQ youth who have been inspired by the Born This Way Foundation's work. The group explores links between mental health and three different types of kindness—kindness to ourselves, kindness to others, and kindness within our communities—sharing difficult struggles and important lessons from their own mental health journeys.

Cast
 Lady Gaga
 Dr. Alfiee Breland-Noble
 Bryan Delgado
 Tyris Winter
 Diana Ambrosio
 Austin Skelton
 Angelique Ayoade
 Mary May
 Carla Ilbarra
 Ben Osborne
 Marty James Gonzalez
 Baraah Oriqat

Release and reception
The documentary short The Power of Kindness was released online via Facebook Watch on Saturday, November 13, 2021 in honor of World Kindness Day, an international holiday promoting the importance of kindness and compassion introduced by the World Kindness Movement. It was shared via Lady Gaga’s Facebook and Instagram feeds and premiered on the Born This Way Foundation website the same day.

The Power of Kindness was featured in multiple major online and television news outlets, including Rolling Stone, People, Variety, New York Magazine’s Vulture, and CBS Mornings. CBS Mornings anchor Gayle King praised Gaga and the importance of the film’s focus on mental health, saying, “I love that she's doing this. How many of us have said, 'How are you?' 'Fine, fine, fine,' and you're really not fine [...] We live in a society where everything is
so vitriolic and so mean. I know that she cares about this; she's committed to it."

References

External links
 The Power of Kindness IMDB

2021 short films
2020s English-language films